Done Deal is the fifth and final studio album by American rapper Big Mello. It was released in 2003 via Woss Ness Entertainment.

Track listing

External links

2003 albums
Big Mello albums
Albums published posthumously